Sart is a name for the settled inhabitants of Central Asia. It may also refer to:

 Sat Thai, a festival in Thailand, alternatively spelled Sart Thai
 Sat Chin or Sart Chin, the Ghost Festival as it is known in Thailand
 A village in Turkey, formerly known as Sardis
 Sart (album), by Norwegian saxophonist Jan Garbarek
 Chagatai language, also known as Sart

Sart or Le Sart is a common French-language place name, which may refer to:
 Le Sart, a village in the commune of Merville, Nord department, France
 Anguilcourt-le-Sart, a village and commune in the Aisne department, France
 Fesmy-le-Sart, a village and commune in the Aisne department, France
 Le Sart, a hamlet near Neufchâteau, in the Luxembourg province of Belgium
 Le Sart, a hamlet near Bertrix, in the Luxembourg province of Belgium

SART may refer to:
 Santa Ana River Trail
 Search and rescue transponder
 Sexual assault response team
 Simultaneous algebraic reconstruction technique
 State Administration of Radio and Television